L'Huillier may refer to:

 Anne L'Huillier (born 1958), French physicist
 Jean-Philippe L'Huillier (born 1951), Swiss sailor
 Peter L'Huillier (1926–2007), scholar of canon law and archbishop of the Orthodox Church in America
 Simon Antoine Jean L'Huilier (or L'Huillier) (1750–1840), Swiss mathematician
 Fort L'Huillier (sometimes spelled Le Hillier), a short-lived fortification in New France